Anthony Robin Bilbie (29 April 1942 – 29 August 2015) was an English cricketer.  He was a right-handed batsman.  He was born at Sherwood, Nottinghamshire.

Bilbie made his first-class debut for Nottinghamshire against Hampshire in the 1960 County Championship. He made thirteen further first-class appearances for the county, the last of which came against Oxford University in 1963.  In his fourteen first-class matches, he scored a total of 291 runs at an average of 11.19, with a high score of 39.

References

External links
Robin Bilbie at ESPNcricinfo
Robin Bilbie at CricketArchive

1942 births
2015 deaths
People from Sherwood, Nottingham
Cricketers from Nottinghamshire
English cricketers
Nottinghamshire cricketers